What Went Down is the fourth studio album by British rock band Foals, released on 28 August 2015 via Transgressive Records in the United Kingdom. The album is produced by James Ford, known for his work with Simian Mobile Disco, The Last Shadow Puppets and Arctic Monkeys amongst others. Frontman Yannis Philippakis called it their loudest and heaviest record to date. What Went Down debuted at number 3 on the UK Albums Chart and at number 58 on the Billboard 200, making it their highest charting album in the United States to date. It is the band's last album with bassist Walter Gervers prior to his departure in January 2018.

Promotion and release
On 9 June 2015, a 12-second clip teaser of the band performing aggressively in an empty warehouse entitled "FOALS // 2015" was released through their social media. Two days later, it was announced that What Went Down was to be released 28 August 2015 via Transgressive Records with a slightly longer trailer in lieu.

On 16 June, the album's self-titled debut single was debuted on DJ Annie Mac's BBC Radio 1 show, along with the premiere of the music video (directed by Niall O'Brien) via YouTube.

Reception

What Went Down received largely positive reviews from contemporary music critics. At Metacritic, which assigns a normalised rating out of 100 to reviews from mainstream critics, the album received an average score of 77, based on 23 reviews, which indicates "generally favorable reviews".

Mark Beaumont of NME praised the album, saying, "For ‘What Went Down’, written in their Oxford “stinkbox”, they have found their fulcrum. Riffs. Massive, fucking heavy cavern rock riffs, the size of cathedrals and the weight of God's balls. They slammed into your eardrums like wrecking balls the first time you heard the compulsive title-track, aghast that these desert rock goliaths could be the same band that sounded like frivolous disco pixies just two years ago. Opening their fourth album, Yannis roaring “When I see a man I see a lion!” over its Stooges-meets-Queens fuzz throttle, it sounds like a defining statement, an arrival. They've mastered math rock, destroyed disco and flattened funk, now they measure hard rock in their hands like a medicine ball, and find it a comfortable weight."

Ian Cohen of Pitchfork gave the album a generally positive review noting that, "What Went Down is the latest example of Foals’ uncanny ability to make records whose basic musical trajectory and quality are nearly equal regardless of the band's intentions going in. And What Went Down is their most consistent, steady-handed work yet—the distance between their purest pop moments ("Miami", "My Number") and their opulent ballads ("Spanish Sahara") has virtually disappeared. It's also significantly less exciting than Total Life Forever and Holy Fire, dynamic records because of their unevenness and ambitious strain—while Foals have realized a sound that's truly their own, they sound far too comfortable in it."

Accolades

Track listing

Personnel
Foals
Yannis Philippakis – vocals, guitar, art direction
Jack Bevan – drums
Jimmy Smith – guitar, keyboards
Walter Gervers – bass, backing vocals 
Edwin Congreave – keyboards, backing vocals

Technical personnel
James Ford – producer, additional keyboards, guitar & percussion
Jimmy Robertson – engineer
Damien Arlot – studio assistant
Alan Moulder – mixing at Assault & Battery Studios, London
Caesar Edmunds – mix assistant
John Davis – mastering at Metropolis Studios, London
Foals – studio photography
Daisuke Yokota – artwork and additional photography
Neil Krug – additional photography
Mike Lythgoe – design

DVD personnel
Kit Monteith and Foals – filming and editing of "Crème anglaise" and the Poolside Sessions
Niall O'Brien – director of "What Went Down"
Liz Kessler – producer of "What Went Down"

Charts

Weekly charts

Year-end charts

Certifications

References

2015 albums
Foals (band) albums
Transgressive Records albums
Warner Records albums
Albums produced by James Ford (musician)